Richard Williams (15 December 1905 – 27 May 1983) was an English footballer who played in the Football League for Reading and Stoke City.

Career
Williams played for Jarrow before being spotted by scouts from Stoke City in 1926. It took him until the 1928–29 season before he could displace Bob Dixon. He played in 36 matches that season and then 24 in 1929–30 but he lost his place to Norman Lewis. He then spent a season at Reading and Chester.

Career statistics

Honours
Stoke City
Football League Third Division North champions: 1926–27

References

1905 births
1983 deaths
Footballers from Newcastle upon Tyne
Association football goalkeepers
English footballers
Jarrow F.C. players
Stoke City F.C. players
Reading F.C. players
Chester City F.C. players
Macclesfield Town F.C. players
English Football League players